RockNess 2009 was the fourth RockNess Festival to take place. It took place on the 12th, 13th and 14 June 2009 with for the first time acts playing on the Friday. The headlining acts were The Flaming Lips, The Prodigy, Biffy Clyro, Basement Jaxx, Dizzee Rascal, Orbital and Placebo.

The RockNess organisers held a DJ competition throughout Scotland to find new DJ talent. Heats were held across the country with final being held in Glasgow. The winner was 19-year-old Fuad from Aberdeen played just before Pete Tong on the 13th. There were also 2 runners up.

The line-up was as follows.

The following acts also played across the weekend on the ‘goNORTH’ stage: Alex Cornish, Barn Owel, Bronto Skylift, Call To Mind, Casiokids, Cast of the Capital, Colour-Coded, Come On Bang!, Daily Bread, Dotjr, The French Wives, Hey Enemy, Jack Butler, Keser, Mitchell Museum, Nacional, Our Lunar Activities, Pooch, Strawhouses, Spyamp, St Deluxe, Team William, Theatre Fall, The Naked Strangers, The Ray Summers, Tone, Trapped in Kansas, Vcheka, We See Lights and Yaweh.

References

2009
2009 in Scotland
2009 in British music
2009 music festivals
June 2009 events in the United Kingdom